High Valley is a Canadian country music band from Blumenort, Alberta, a small community near the hamlet of La Crete. The group is composed of Brad Rempel (lead vocals) and his supporting band, Dave Myers (bass guitar), Sam Bergeson (vocals), Raymond Klassen (Dobro), Clint Milburn (guitar), and Andrew Hemmerling (drums). Brad Rempel's brother Bryan Rempel was a member until March 2014, while younger brother Curtis Rempel was a member until June 2021. All three grew up in a Mennonite community and graduated from La Crete Public School.

After a number of chart successes in Canada between 2010 and 2015, High Valley were signed to Atlantic Records Nashville in October 2015. Shortly after that, the single "Make You Mine" was released to United States country radio. It debuted at  56 on the US Country chart. They have three No. 1 hits on the Billboard Canada Country chart with "I Be U Be", "Grew Up On That", and "River's Still Running".

Biography 
High Valley's album Broken Borders was named Album of the Year at the 2007 GMA Canada Covenant Awards, while the song "Back to You" was awarded Country Song of the Year. High Valley's second album, High Valley, was released in Canada and the United States on September 14, 2010.  In 2011 the band won five GMA Canada Covenant Awards, including Artist of the Year and Group of the Year. Their third album, Love Is a Long Road, was released on June 12, 2012.

Discography

Albums

Extended plays

Singles

Christmas singles

Promotional singles

Music videos

Tours
Headlining
County Line Tour – 2014
Make You Mine Tour (Europe) – 2017
The Highway Finds Tour – 2017
Supporting
Love Unleashed Tour – Martina McBride (2016)
Soul2Soul: The World Tour – Tim McGraw and Faith Hill (2017)
Happy Endings Tour – Old Dominion (2018)
The Journey Tour – Paul Brandt (2019)

Awards

Academy of Country Music Awards

GMA Canada Covenant Awards
 2007 two awards: Country/Bluegrass Album of the Year: Broken Borders, and Country/Bluegrass Song of the Year: "Back to You"
 2011 five awards: Artist of the Year, Group of the Year, Country/Bluegrass Album of the Year: High Valley, Country/Bluegrass Song of the Year: "A Father's Love (The Only Way He Knew How)", and Video of the Year: "A Father's Love (The Only Way He Knew How)"
 2012 three awards: Artist of the Year, Country/Bluegrass Album of the Year: "Love Is a Long Road" and Country/Bluegrass Song of the Year "Have I Told You I Love You Lately"

Canadian Country Music Association Awards

Juno Awards

Notes

References

External links
 

Musical groups established in 1997
Musical groups from Alberta
Canadian country music groups
Centricity Music artists
Open Road Recordings artists
Atlantic Records artists
Country music duos
1997 establishments in Alberta
Canadian Country Music Association Group or Duo of the Year winners
Mennonite musicians